Conocliniopsis is a genus of flowering plants in the family Asteraceae. It contains a single species, Conocliniopsis prasiifolia.

References

Eupatorieae
Monotypic Asteraceae genera